The Council for Foreign and Defense Policy (CFDP, SVOP)  is a Russian Think Tank. It was formed on February 25, 1992. It has been called the "leading public foreign policy organization" for Russia.

Russian President Vladimir Putin regularly participates in the Council for Foreign and Defense Policy discussion club "Valdai".

Activities

The most important forms of day-to-day activities of the Council for Foreign and Defense Policy are regular and informal meetings of Council members; holding conferences, seminars and discussion meetings; organization of research projects; informational, educational and lobbying activities. During its existence, the Council on Foreign and Defense Policy has implemented a number of projects. Priority among them programs: "Strategy for Russia", "Russia-Belarus", "Russia-Ukraine", "Russia-Baltic", "Russia and the World", "Military Reform", "Russia- NATO”, “Russia and the EU”, “Russian-American Dialogue”, “Russia-Japan”.

The Council for Foreign and Defense Policy carries out its activities in close cooperation with a number of parliamentary and government bodies, including the Committees of the State Duma of the Russian Federation on international affairs, on defense; Administration of the President of the Russian Federation, Russian Federation Ministry of Foreign Affairs, Russian Federation Ministry of Defense,  other power ministries and departments, Ministry of the Russian Federation for Atomic Energy; with academic institutions, primarily with the Institute of Europe and IMEMO RAS. Council for Foreign and Defense Policy also develops contacts with a number of leading foreign government and private organizations.

An important component of the Council's activity is horizontal informal ties between its members and civil society groups and organizations which support by members of the Council for Foreign and Defense Policy of mutually beneficial undertakings.

Projects

Ranking
In 2017 the Think Tanks and Civil Societies Program's, Global Go To Think Tank Index (GGTTI) ranking of think tanks, the Council for Foreign and Defense Policy is in a number of "sub-lists": 
  41st out of 135 under Top Foreign Policy and International Affairs Think Tanks.  
   58th of 110 under Top Think Tank by Area Research.
  24th out of 75 "Best Government Affiliated Think Tanks" 
 107th out of 150 "Best Independent Think Tanks"

Publications 
 U.S. Russian Relations at the Turn of the Century: Reports of the Working Groups Organized by the Carnegie Endowment for International Peace, Washington and the Council on Foreign and Defense Policy.  2000.

Chairman of the Presidium 
 Alexey Georgievich Arbatov    (:ru:Арбатов, Алексей Георгиевич)
 Tatyana Viktorovna Borisova (:ru:Борисова, Татьяна Викторовна)
 Vladimir Sergeevich Velichko    (:ru:Величко, Владимир Сергеевич)
 Sergey Alexandrovich Karaganov   (:ru:Караганов, Сергей Александрович)
 Yuri Georgievich Kobaladze  (:ru:Кобаладзе, Юрий Георгиевич)
 Evgeny Mikhailovich Kozhokin  (:ru:Кожокин, Евгений Михайлович)
 Fedor Alexandrovich Lukyanov 2014 AKA Fyodor Lukyanov.   (:ru:Лукьянов, Федор Александрович)
 Alexander Vyacheslavovich Losev   (:ru:Лосев, Александр Вячеславович)
 Viktor Nikolaevich Mironov   (:ru:Миронов, Виктор Николаевич)
 Nikolai Vasilievich Mikhailov   (:ru:Михайлов, Николай Васильевич)
 Sergei Ashotovich Mndoyants   (:ru:Мндоянц, Сергей Ашотович)
 Alexander Vladimirovich Mordovin   (:ru:Мордовин, Александр Владимирович)
 Vyacheslav Alekseevich Nikonov   (:ru:Никонов, Вячеслав Алексеевич)
 Alexey Konstantinovich Pushkov   (:ru:Пушков, Алексей Константинович)
 Vladimir Arsentievich Rubanov   (:ru:Рубанов, Владимир Арсентьевич)
 Vladimir Alexandrovich Ryzhkov   (:ru:Рыжков, Владимир Александрович)
 Garegin Ashotovich Tosunyan   (:ru:Тосунян, Гарегин Ашотович)
 Vitaly Tovievich Tretyakov   (:ru:Третьяков, Виталий Товиевич)
 Alexander Valeryanovich Tsalko   (:ru:Цалко, Александр Валерьянович)
 Igor Yurievich Yurgens   (:ru:Юргенс, Игорь Юрьевич)

Notes

External links 
 Russia in Foreign Affairs, funded by Council for Foreign and Defense Policy
 Official page in Russian

Think tanks based in Russia
Organizations established in 1992
Organizations based in Russia